The Long Shot, sometimes called The Long Shot: Believe in Courage, is a Hallmark Channel film that aired April 18, 2004.  It stars Julie Benz and Marsha Mason and centers around a dressage competition.

Plot summary
Annie Garrett (Julie Benz) is a young woman who moves with her slacker husband Ross and their seven-year-old daughter Taylor (Gage Golightly) from Colorado to a ranch in northern California.  After he fails to land a job as promised, Ross abandons Annie and Taylor. With nowhere to turn, and their horse to look after, Annie gets a job as a ranch hand and stable person at a stud farm owned by Mary Lou O'Brien (Marsha Mason), a stern woman who is dealing with her own past.  Inspired by Mary Lou's encouragement, Annie decides to enter into a dressage competition with her horse she trained herself, Tolo. Unfortunately, Tolo becomes blind and Annie is injured. When she recovers she goes to compete on one of Mary Lou's horses, California Red, but due to an unexpected visit, the horse is unable to compete. In order to compete, she has to believe in herself and have faith in Tolo to win.

Cast
 Julie Benz as Annie Garrett
 Marsha Mason as Mary Lou O'Brian
 Paul Le Mat as Guido Levits
 Gage Golightly as Taylor Garrett, Annie's daughter
David Alexander as Monte Shelton
Christopher Cousins as John Oaks
John Livingston as Ross Garrett, Annie's husband
 Robert Pine as Douglas McCloud
 Laura Johnson as Bonnie McCloud
 Juliette Goglia as Colleen O'Brian, Mary Lou's granddaughter
Joe Russell as Security Guard

Promotion
Schering-Plough signed on its product Claritin as the network's entitlement sponsor for The Long Shot.  This meant that not only did the film's title artwork include the Claritin logo, but the brand would be featured in every promotion and spot regarding the movie's premiere. This made The Long Shot the network's first exclusive entitlement-sponsored film.

Reception
The Long Shot did moderately for the network, premiering with a 1.8 household rating. However, at the time it aired, the movie ranked #1 in average "Length of Tune" over all competitive cable original movies.

External links

The Long Shot at Hallmark Channel
The Long Shot at Hallmark Channel UK

References

2004 television films
2004 films
Hallmark Channel original films
Films about horses
Horse sports in film
Films directed by Georg Stanford Brown
Films scored by Mark Watters